The Biratnagar Jute Mill Strike (Majdur Hartal)  of March 1947 was a labour strike in Biratnagar, Nepal, by workers and laborers of Biratnagar Jute Mill, Ltd. The strike was initially against the management regarding labor rights, but gradually turned into a nationwide anti-regime movement.

Background

According to the workers in the mill, there were no labour rights in the mill and the mill-owners disregarded their input. The living conditions of workers were also very poor, with no running-water in the quarters.
It also was clear that a handful of people were suppressing the workers in the mill.

Strike
The demonstration  started on March 4, 1947  under the leadership of Girija Prasad Koirala, along with Tarini Prasad Koirala, Man Mohan Adhikari, and Yuvaraj Adhikari, as employees in the mill.
The strike was launched with demands purely based on labour rights, but later political trade union rights were also demanded. The Nepali Congress supported the strike at Biratnagar. On March 9, Bishweshwar Prasad Koirala joined the strike with his supporters and the strike grew in number. The Rana dynasty regime sent state troops to Biratnagar to put down the strike.The strike ended when the troops reached Biratnagar after they arrested the leaders. Some of these leaders escaped capture by fleeing to India. Six National Congress leaders (Bishweshwar Prasad Koirala, Girija Prasad Koirala, Tarini Prasad Koirala, Gehendrahari Sharma, Manmohan Adhikari and Yubaraj Adhikari were walked to Kathmandu as prisoners . The Nepali congress held a conference in Jogbani, India and  resolved to initiate a nationwide Satyagraha, or civil disobedience movement. Thus, the countrywide anti-Rana demonstration started.

Aftermath

On April 13 the Anti-Rana movement began as scheduled with thousands of Nepali voluntarily getting arrested in Biratnagar, Kathmandu, Janakpur, and Birgunj. They demanded release of all political prisoners, as well as the institutionalization of civil rights. The turnout in Kathmandu unnerved the Rana regime. In Kathmandu, tens of thousands of commoners gathered in the street and protested in an anti-Rana procession. On May 16, after weeks of protest, Prime minister Padma Shamsher Jang Bahadur Rana gave a historical speech in which he announced his desire to bring non-Rana commoners into the Government in greater degree than previous.

Releasing of detainees
After his promising speech Padma Shamsher ordered the release of most of the detainees throughout the country. However, Bishweshwar Prasad Koirala and his associates from Biratnagar remained in detention. Many requests were made by Indian politicians to release them, and they were finally released in August 1947, after the request of Mahatma Gandhi.

See also
Bishweshwar Prasad Koirala
History of Nepal
Rana dynasty
Nepali Congress

References

 

1947 in Nepal
Rana regime
1947 labor disputes and strikes
Economic history of Nepal
Jute industry